The 2010 Macau transfer of sovereignty anniversary protest (2010年澳門回歸示威遊行) occurred on December 20, 2010 on the 11th anniversary of the Transfer of sovereignty of Macau.  The protest took place on the same date as the handover anniversary in 1999.  The protesters mainly complained about universal suffrage, housing prices and how the Macau citizens are treated worse than the pandas given to them by Beijing.

Protest
The protest initially started with the Macau pro-democracy camp and members of the labor union.  The march went from Iao Hon Park to the government offices shouting slogans and waving banners.  The theme was to fight against Macau Government corruption, fight for democracy and to improve livelihood. (反貪腐、爭民主、保民生).  About 1,200 to 1,300 people participated wearing panda masks.

In December 2010 Beijing central government sent two pandas to Macau for good will.  The names of the two pandas are hoi hoi (開開) and sum sum (心心), meaning "happy" (開心) in Chinese.  The Macau government has already arranged a million dollar luxury home for the pandas, while the people are neglected in unaffordable bad public housing.  The 3,000m2 panda pavilion at Seac Pai Van Park in Coloane Island is budgeted at 80-90 million patacas (about US$10,000,000).

More criticism followed that the pandas should be called po po (普普) and syun syun (選選), meaning "universal suffrage" (普選).  Others called for affordable housing and universal suffrage for the 2019 Macau chief executive election.  Chief executive Fernando Chui was accused of ignoring high inflation and rocketing home prices.

Reactions
Fernando Chiu responded saying livelihood is his prime concern and he does listen to the demands and views of the public.  Meanwhile, previous Macau chief Edmund Ho won the Grand lotus award.

See also
 2007 Macau transfer of sovereignty anniversary protest
 2010 Macau labour protest

References

2010 in Macau
Macau transfer of sovereignty anniversary
Protests in Macau